The 2009 FA Cup final was the 128th final of the world's oldest domestic football cup competition, the FA Cup. The final was played at Wembley Stadium in London on 30 May 2009 and marked the third time that the final has been staged at the stadium since it was rebuilt. The match was contested by Chelsea, who beat Arsenal 2–1 in their semi-final, and Everton who beat Manchester United 4–2 on penalties after a 0–0 draw after extra time. After Louis Saha opened the scoring after just 25 seconds, the fastest ever goal in an FA Cup Final, Didier Drogba equalised in the 21st minute before Frank Lampard scored the winner with 19 minutes left to play to give Chelsea their fifth FA Cup success.

Background
Chelsea went into the match as four-time FA Cup winners, having previously won in 1970, 1997, 2000 and 2007, while Everton had won the competition five times previously, having won in 1906, 1933, 1966, 1984 and 1995. Coincidentally, both teams' most recent titles came in the FA Cup, both teams beating Manchester United in the final; Everton in 1995 and Chelsea in 2007.

The two teams drew 0–0 in both meetings during the 2008–09 Premier League season, at Goodison Park in December and at Stamford Bridge in April. Prior to the 2009 final, the two teams had never met in the FA Cup Final; their most recent meeting in the FA Cup came in the Fourth Round of the 2005–06 competition, when Chelsea won 4–1 in a replay at Stamford Bridge after a 1–1 draw at Goodison Park. In 157 matches between the two sides in all competitions, Chelsea had recorded 61 wins, Everton had won 49, and 47 matches finished as draws.

Route to the final

 Both clubs received a bye to round three.
 In square brackets is a letter that represents the opposition's division
 [PL] = Premier League
 [C] = Championship
 [L1] = League One
 [L2] = League Two

Pre-match

Ticketing
Everton and Chelsea were each allocated 25,109 tickets for the final. Having sold over 32,000 for their semi-final win over Manchester United, Everton were unhappy and disappointed with this allocation. The match was Everton's first FA Cup final in 14 years and Everton chief executive Robert Elstone predicted that the club could have sold in excess of 70,000 tickets for this game. Chelsea also said that the size of their allocation meant that it was unlikely that there would be sufficient tickets for all of their hospitality and non-hospitality season ticket holders.

Club Wembley ten-year season ticket holders were also guaranteed a ticket for the match. After those tickets were allocated, 70% of the remaining tickets were distributed amongst the clubs that had competed in the 2008–09 competition, with the other 30% given to those involved in grassroots football and the "football family".

Kits
Since both finalists' first-choice kits are predominantly blue, a coin was tossed to determine which team would have the first choice of kit. Everton won the toss and chose to wear their traditional blue kit, meaning that Chelsea would wear their all-yellow third-choice kit. Chelsea were nevertheless given the "home" dressing room, i.e. that used by the England national team.

Match ball
The official match ball of the 2009 FA Cup Final was the Umbro Dynamis. The Dynamis uses a 20-panel configuration, as opposed to a more traditional 32-panel design, which allegedly makes the ball faster. The surface of the ball is made from a Teijin microfibre material. The Dynamis was also used in the 2008 final, but the 2009 version has a gold colourway.

Opening ceremony
The traditional FA Cup Final song, Abide With Me, was performed by the London Community Gospel Choir. The trophy was then brought out onto the field, followed by the two teams, before the Chief Guest of the final – former Secretary General of the United Nations Kofi Annan – was introduced to the managers and players of both teams, as well as the match officials. The introductions were immediately followed by the singing of the national anthem, "God Save the Queen", sung by Britain's Got Talent 2008 finalist, 13-year-old Faryl Smith, making her the youngest performer of the national anthem at the FA Cup final.

Match

Team selection

Everton were without long-term injury victims Phil Jagielka, Mikel Arteta, Yakubu Aiyegbeni, Victor Anichebe and Nuno Valente. On-loan Brazilian striker Jô was cup-tied. Andy van der Meyde, who set up the winning goal in the fourth round tie with Liverpool, had since been released by the club. This meant that there was a place on the Everton bench for 17-year-old winger Jose Baxter.

Summary

First half
Louis Saha scored for Everton with a left-footed shot to the bottom-left corner just 25 seconds into the match, the fastest goal in FA Cup Final history. The previous fastest goal was by Bob Chatt of Aston Villa 30 seconds into the 1895 final. Tony Hibbert received a yellow card for tripping Florent Malouda in the eighth minute. Didier Drogba levelled the match for Chelsea in the 21st minute with a header set up by a left-wing cross from Malouda.

Second half
Tony Hibbert was replaced by Lars Jacobsen for Everton to begin the second half, and two minutes in, Toffees captain Phil Neville was booked. Chelsea replaced Michael Essien with Michael Ballack in the 61st minute, followed two minutes later by a yellow card for Mikel John Obi. Frank Lampard scored the winning goal for Chelsea in the 72nd minute with a left foot shot. Five minutes later, a shot from Malouda appeared to crash down off the bar and over the line, but it was not given. Everton replaced Saha with James Vaughan at that point. Dan Gosling was the last substitute for Everton in the 81st minute, replacing Leon Osman. Lampard received a yellow card in the 84th minute, while in the fourth minute of added time, Leighton Baines of Everton was booked.

Details

Statistics

Records
Louis Saha scored the fastest ever FA Cup Final goal when he drove home with just 25 seconds on the clock to put Everton ahead.
Ashley Cole collected his fifth FA Cup winners' medal, and became the first man to win the cup five times since the 19th century.
Everton's defeat meant that they finished as FA Cup runners-up for the eighth time, more than any other club.

References

2009
Final
Fa Cup Final 2009
Fa Cup Final 2009
Fa Cup Final
Events at Wembley Stadium
Fa Cup Final